The Vaulted Celing is an 1851 historical novel by Alexandre Herculano.

Set in 1401, it deals with the construction of Batalha Monastery by the blind architect Afonso Domingues.

See also 
 Alexandre Herculano
 Romanticism in Portugal

References

Bibliography 
 Dicionário Universal Ilustrado, Ed. João Romano Torres & Cª.1911.

1851 novels
19th-century Portuguese novels
Historical novels
Romanticism
Novels set in the 15th century
Novels about architects